Brewery of Eggshells is an Irish fairy tale collected in 1825 by Thomas Crofton Croker in his first volume of Fairy Legends and Traditions of the South of Ireland.

Synopsis
A woman had to leave her twin babies alone for a time. When she returned, she saw two elves in blue petticoats cross her path.  The babies looked the same, but would not grow.  She and her husband argued about whether the children were theirs.  A wise man told her to make pottage in an eggshell, as if she intended to feed the entire troop of harvesters with it.  When she did, the children exclaimed on it as something they had never seen, though they were older than acorns grown into oaks.  She threw them into the water, which made their own parents take them back and give back the twins.

References

Irish fairy tales
Irish folklore